General Hospital is the longest running ABC Daytime television program (soap opera), airing on ABC. Created by Frank and Doris Hursley, who originally set it in a general hospital (hence the title), in an unnamed fictional city. In the 1970s, the city was named Port Charles, New York. The series premiered on April 1, 1963. The following list comprises all of the wins and nominations for the soap opera and are presented by the National Academy of Television Arts and Sciences (NATAS), Directors Guild of America (DGA), and Writers Guild of America Award.

Awards and nominations

1974–1979

1980–1989

1990–1999

2000–2009

2010–present

Note

 The Daytime Emmy Awards present their Creative Arts Emmys at separate Creative Arts ceremonies prior to their respective main ceremonies.
  Nominated posthumously.
 Robert Guza, Jr., Head Writer Elizabeth Korte, Associate Head Writer Michele Val Jean, Scriptwriter Susan Wald, Scriptwriter Mary Sue Price Scriptwriter David Goldschmid, Scriptwriter Michael Conforrti, Scriptwriter Garin Wolf, Scriptwriter Karen Harris, Scriptwriter
  Tied with The Bold and the Beautiful.
  Co-Head writer with Robert Guza, Jr.: February 2007 – October 2007
  Head writer: October 2007 – January 3, 2008; March 17, 2008 – July 25, 2011
  Head writer from February 2012 – October 2015.
  Associate head writer: August 10, 2011 – January 6, 2012; February 21, 2012 – February 28, 2013.
  Tied with Fred Willard as John Forrester on The Bold and the Beautiful (CBS) and Ray Wise as Ian Ward on The Young and the Restless (CBS)
  New Head Writers from October 2015 – present.

See also

 General Hospital
 General Hospital cast members
 List of previous General Hospital cast members
 List of General Hospital characters

References

External links

General Hospital
Daytime Emmy Award for Outstanding Drama Series winners